Pam is a surname. Notable people by that name include:

 Avraham Yaakov Pam (1913–2001), rosh yeshiva in New York
 David Pam (1920–2014), British historian
 Max Pam (born 1949), Australian photographer
 Sam Pam (born 1968), Nigerian former footballer
 Dr. Zeev Pam (1953-2013), Israeli Dermatologist, born in Poland. http://www.dermapam.com/aboutus

See also
Pamela (name), a feminine given name.